As the second year of the massive Russo-Japanese War begins, more than 100,000 die in the largest world battles of that era, and the war chaos leads to the 1905 Russian Revolution against Nicholas II of Russia (Shostakovich's 11th Symphony is subtitled The Year 1905 to commemorate this) and the start of Revolution in the Kingdom of Poland. Canada and the U.S. expand west, with the Alberta and Saskatchewan provinces and the founding of Las Vegas. 1905 is also the year in which Albert Einstein, at this time resident in Bern, publishes his four Annus Mirabilis papers in Annalen der Physik (Leipzig) (March 18, May 11, June 30 and September 27), laying the foundations for more than a century's study of theoretical physics.

Events

January 

 January 1 – In a major defeat in the Russo-Japanese War, General Anatoly Stessel of the Russian Army surrender Port Arthur, located on mainland China, to the Japanese. On January 3, Japan formally repossesses the port and renames it Ryojun, holding it for the next 40 years. The area will revert in 1945 to China and become the Lushunkou District.
 January 4
Gheorghe Grigore Cantacuzino becomes Prime Minister of Romania for the second time, having previously served from 1899 to 1900, and remains in office for more than two years. 
The city of Bend, Oregon, plotted out in 1900 by Alexander Drake, is incorporated as a town for local logging companies, and will have a population of 536 in 1910. By the year 2020, it will have almost 100,000 residents. 
 January 5 – Baroness Emma Orczy's play The Scarlet Pimpernel, the forerunner of her novel, opens at the New Theatre in London, beginning a run of 122 performances and numerous revivals.
 January 6
The Lick Observatory announces the discovery of a sixth moon of Jupiter, made by their astronomer Charles D. Perrine. Unlike the first five Jovian satellites discovered, the sixth one will be referred to by number as "Jupiter VI" until 1975, when named Himalia.
The U.S. Senate confirms the nomination of William D. Crum, an African-American, to the office of collector of customs at Charleston, South Carolina after Crum's nomination by President Theodore Roosevelt.
 January 11 – Under the supervision of five editors, work begins on the comprehensive Catholic Encyclopedia, subtitled "An International Work of Reference on the Constitution, Doctrine, Discipline, and History of the Catholic Church" and published by the Robert Appleton Company. The first volume will appear in 1907.
 January 14 – Jens Christian Christensen takes office as the new Prime Minister of Denmark.
 January 17 – In France, Prime Minister Émile Combes and his cabinet announce their resignations after being implicated in the Affair of the Cards (L'Affaire des Fiches), a system set up by the War Ministry to purge the French Army officers corps of Jesuits. 
 January 21 – The Dominican Republic sign an agreement with the United States to allow the U.S. to administer the collection of customs taxes for Santo Domingo for 50 years, with the U.S. to assume responsibility for payment of the Republic's debts to foreign nations from Dominican income. The agreement is done as an exercise of the "Roosevelt Corollary" to the Monroe Doctrine. 
 January 22 (January 9 O.S.) – The Bloody Sunday massacre of peaceful Russian demonstrators at the Winter Palace in Saint Petersburg takes place, leading to an unsuccessful uprising.
 January 24 – Maurice Rouvier forms a government as the new Prime Minister of France.
 January 25 – Tsar Nicholas II appoints General Dmitri Trepov to be the Governor-General of Saint Petersburg, with absolute power to issue regulations to keep order.
 January 26 – (January 13 O.S. in Russia) 
Russian Revolution of 1905: The Imperial Russian Army opens fire on demonstrators in Riga, Governorate of Livonia, killing 73 people and injuring 200.
Elections are held in Hungary for the 413 seats in the Országgyűlés, the Kingdom's parliament within Austria-Hungary. Voters overwhelmingly reject the Liberal Party, led by Prime Minister István Tisza, that has ruled Hungary since 1875, and the Liberals lose 118 of their 277 seats, but Emperor Franz Joseph I of Austria-Hungary (in his capacity as King Ferenc József) ignores the results and keeps Tisza in power.
 January 27 – The Nelson Act is passed into law in the United States, providing for racial segregation of schools in the Alaska Territory. 
 January 29 – Rioting breaks out in Warsaw, at this time under Russian Imperial rule with a Russian Governor-General.
 January 30 – The U.S. Supreme Court renders its unanimous decision in the landmark case of Swift & Co. v. United States, allowing the federal government to regulate monopolies.
 January 31 – "The greatest ball of the Gilded Age" is held by James Hazen Hyde, the 28-year-old heir to the fortune of the founder of the Equitable Life Assurance Association" at New York City's Sherry Hotel, spending $200,000 for a "Louis XV costume ball" for invited guests.

February 

 February 1 – U.S. Senator John H. Mitchell of Oregon is indicted by a federal grand jury on charges arising from a scandal involving land grants in the state and illegally using his influence for private clients.  
 February 3 – The first performance of A Shropshire Lad, the setting to music of the 1896 set of 63 poems of A. E. Housman by Arthur Somervell as a song-cycle, takes place at Aeolian Hall in London.
 February 4 – A simultaneous uprising begins at six cities in Argentina against the government of President Manuel Quintana. 
The castaways live on the isle for more than three months until being rescued on May 7.
 February 6 – Eliel Soisalon-Soininen, the Chancellor of Justice of the Grand Duchy of Finland (at this time part of the Russian Empire) is assassinated at Helsingfors (modern-day Helsinki). 
 February 9 – Dr. Prince A. Morrow begins the movement in the U.S. for sex education, with the founding of the Society of Sanitary and Moral Prophylaxis.
 February 12 – The Switzerland national football team plays its first international game, losing to France, 1 to 0. 
 February 16 – Six of the 11 crew of the British Royal Navy submarine HMS A5 are killed by a pair of explosions caused by gasoline fumes in Ireland.
 February 17 – Grand Duke Sergei Alexandrovich of Russia, the Governor-General of Moscow and uncle of Tsar Nicholas II, is assassinated. 
 February 20 – In the Russo-Japanese War, the Battle of Mukden begins in Manchuria. 
 February 21 – Sir Wilfrid Laurier introduces a resolution in the Canadian parliament proposing that two new provinces, Alberta and Saskatchewan, be created out of the Northwest Territories. 
 February 23 – Rotary International is founded in Chicago in the U.S.
 February 26 – Russia sustains a severe defeat in Manchuria at Tsen-ho-Cheng.   
 February 28 – Jane Stanford, the co-founder with her husband Leland of Stanford University, is fatally poisoned while visiting the Moana Hotel in Hawaii.

March 

 March 2 – Russia's Committee of Ministers votes to grant religious freedom to the subjects of the Russian Empire.
 March 3 – Tsar Nicholas II of Russia announces his decision to create an elected assembly, the Duma, to represent the people of the Russian Empire in an advisory capacity, although the real power to make laws will remain with the Tsar and the cabinet of ministers. 
 March 10 – Russo-Japanese War: The Japanese capture of Mukden (modern-day Shenyang) completes the rout of Russian armies in Manchuria. The Russian Army commander, General Aleksey Kuropatkin, telegraphs the Tsar that his armies will be retreating to avoid further danger.
 March 13 – Mata Hari introduces her exotic dance act in the Musée Guimet, Paris.
 March 14 – 23 of the 26 crew of the British barque Kyber die when the ship is wrecked off England's Land's End.
 March 17 – U.S. President Theodore Roosevelt gives the bride away at the wedding of his 20-year-old niece, Anna Eleanor Roosevelt, to her distant cousin, 23-year-old law student Franklin Delano Roosevelt. 
 March 18 – Albert Einstein submits his paper "On a heuristic viewpoint concerning the production and transformation of light", in which he explained the photoelectric effect using the notion of light quanta, for publication. 
 March 20
 The Grover Shoe Factory disaster kills 58 employees in Brockton, Massachusetts, when a boiler explodes and the factory building collapses. 
 The title Prime Minister of the United Kingdom is officially recognised by King Edward VII by a royal warrant.
 March 22 – Russia's Committee of Ministers votes to abolish the compulsory use of the Russian language in schools in "Congress Poland" (Tsarstvo Polskoye).
 March 23 – The Theriso revolt begins in Crete as about 1,500 people led by Eleftherios Venizelos demand unification with Greece.
 March 24 – Toastmasters International is founded by Ralph C. Smedley in Bloomington, Illinois.
 March 29 – Jimmy Walsh knocks out Monte Attell, in a controversial six-round bout in Philadelphia, to win recognition of the World Bantamweight Championship by the National Boxing Association, despite being disqualified by the referee.

April 

 April 1 – The British Imperial Penny Post is extended to include Australia.
 April 2 – The Simplon Tunnel through the Alps is opened to railway traffic. 
 April 3 – A coal mine explosion at Zeigler, Illinois, kills 50 miners. 
 April 4 – In India, the 1905 Kangra earthquake hits the Kangra Valley, kills 20,000 and destroys most buildings in Kangra, McLeod Ganj and Dharamshala.
 April 5 – The body of John Paul Jones, "Father of the American Navy", is located in Paris almost 113 years after his death. 
 April 6 – A violent strike by the Teamsters' Union begins in Chicago.
 April 8 – Hundreds of people are killed in Spain in the collapse of a dam holding back a reservoir near Madrid.
 April 17 – Russia's Tsar Nicholas II issues a decree granting religious freedom to his subjects.
 April 20 – The largest ocean liner in the world at this time, the German SS Amerika is launched. 
 April 23 – German General Lothar von Trotha commander of troops in Germany's colony of Südwestafrika (modern-day Namibia), orders the extermination of the Nama people within the colony's borders, ultimately killing 10,000. Von Trotha's proclamation Aan de oorlogvorende Namastamme, proclaimed that "The Nama who chooses not to surrender and lets himself be seen in German territory will be shot, until all are exterminated." 
 April 24 – China's Empress Regent Cixi (Tzu Hsi) abolishes further use in executions of the nation's three most cruel torture execution methods, lingchi ("death by a thousand cuts"), gibbeting (similar to crucifixion, hanging until dying of exposure, thirst or starvation), and desecration of a dying person.
 April 28 – A tornado strikes Laredo, Texas and kills 100.
 April 30 – Albert Einstein completes his doctoral dissertation, A New Determination of Molecular Dimensions (submitted July 30 to the University of Zurich).

May 

 May 4 –The first world championship of professional wrestling takes place at Madison Square Garden in New York City.
 May 9 – Upon the death of U.S. social activist Ann Reeves Jarvis In West Virginia, her daughter Anna Jarvis resolves to campaign across the United States for a proposed "Mother's Day". 
 May 10 – In the U.S., A tornado destroys the town of Snyder, Oklahoma, killing 97.
 May 11 – Albert Einstein submits for publication his paper "Über die von der molekularkinetischen Theorie der Wärme geforderte Bewegung von in ruhenden Flüssigkeiten suspendierten Teilchen" ("On the Motion of Small Particles Suspended in a Stationary Liquid, as Required by the Molecular Kinetic Theory of Heat"), based on his doctoral research, delineating a stochastic model of Brownian motion. 
 May 12 – The Natural History Museum in London unveils its popular exhibit of "Dippy", an exact replica of the skeleton of the Diplodocus carnegii dinosaur.
 May 15 – Las Vegas, Nevada, is founded when  of land adjacent to the Union Pacific Railroad tracks are auctioned to what is now today Downtown Las Vegas.
 May 22 – Abdul Hamid II, the Sultan of the Ottoman Empire establishes the Ullah Millet for the Aromanians of the empire. For this reason, the Aromanian National Day is sometimes celebrated on this day. The decision is publicly announced the next day, which is more commonly celebrated.
 May 28 –  At the end of two days in fighting in the Battle of Tsushima, the Russian Imperial Navy has suffered the deaths of more than 14,000 of the 18,000 sailors and officers it had brought to the battle, and all but four of its Pacific ships. The Japanese loss is three torpedo boats and 800 men.
 May 29 – Brooklyn Superbas pitcher Elmer Stricklett introduces the "spitball" to major league baseball.
 May 30 – Japan's Prime Minister Katsura Tarō asks U.S. President Theodore Roosevelt to moderate peace discussions to end the Russo-Japanese War.

June 

 June 1
The Lewis and Clark Exposition opens in Portland, Oregon.
The Sultan of Morocco rejects France's demands for a scheme of reforms.
 June 6 – In Germany's last royal wedding, Crown Prince Wilhelm, son of Kaiser Wilhelm II and heir to the throne, marries Duchess Cecilie of Mecklenburg-Schwerin at Berlin. 
 June 7 – The Norwegian Parliament, the Storting, declares dissolution of the union between Norway and Sweden, giving Norway full independence.
 June 13 – Theodoros Diligiannis, Prime Minister of Greece, is assassinated. 
 June 15 – British Princess Margaret of Connaught marries Prince Gustaf Adolf of Sweden, Duke of Skåne, the future King Gustaf VI Adolf.
 June 18 – A coal mine explosion in Russia kills 500 employees at the Ivan Colliery at Kharsisk.
 June 20 – Dr. Ernest Henry Starling introduces the word "hormone" into the English language. 
 June 21 – New York Central Railroad's 20th Century Limited train is derailed in an apparent act of sabotage, killing 21 people.
 June 25 – The Danish Navy training ship Georg Stage is accidentally sunk after a collision with the English steamship Ancona, killing 22 teenaged recruits.
 June 27 – (June 14 O.S.): Mutiny breaks out on the Russian ironclad Potemkin. 
 June 28 – "Pomp and Circumstance" is first played as a graduation march, after Yale University music professor Samuel Sanford invited its composer, Sir Edward Elgar, to receive an honorary degree.
 June 29 – The Automobile Association is founded in the United Kingdom.
 June 30 – Albert Einstein submits for publication his paper "On the Electrodynamics of Moving Bodies", establishing his theory of special relativity.

July 

 July 1 – Hundreds of people die in the flooding of Guanajunto in Mexico.
 July 3 – France's Chamber of Deputies passes a bill for separation of church and state, 341 to 233.
 July 5 – Alfred Deakin takes office as the new Prime Minister of Australia.
 July 8 – U.S. President Roosevelt sends his 21-year-old daughter, Alice Roosevelt Longworth, and her party on a diplomatic journey to Japan, the Philippines, Hong Kong, China and Korea.
 July 10 – A Japanese expedition takes control of the Russian island of Sakhalin after a short battle. 
 July 11 – National Colliery disaster at Wattstown in the Rhondda valley of Wales: an underground explosion kills 120, with just one survivor.
 July 12 –The University of Sheffield is officially opened by King Edward VII in England.
 July 14
The government of France institutes its first government assistance program for elderly and disabled persons.
In New Zealand, the first known suicide attack by a civilian (as opposed to sacrifices made in military combat) takes place in Murchison.
 July 15 – The popular fictional character Arsène Lupin, the gentleman thief, is introduced in France. 
 July 21 – Sixty members of the crew of the USS Bennington are killed in an explosion of the U.S. Navy gunboat in the harbor at San Diego.
 July 22 – Florence Kelly delivered her landmark speech about child labor before the convention of the National American Woman Suffrage Association in Philadelphia.
 July 24 – An 8.4 magnitude earthquake strikes Mongolia, the second-largest on record here. 
 July 27 – The Taft–Katsura agreement is reached in Tokyo. 
 July 28 – Frankie Neil becomes the new world bantamweight boxing champion by defeating title holder Harry Tenny in a 25-round bout at Colma, California.
 July 30 – At Basel in Switzerland, the International Zionist Conference delegates vote to reject the British officer of land in Uganda for a Jewish homeland.

August

 August 2 – The Ancient Order of Druids initiates neo-Druidic rituals at Stonehenge in England.
 August 7 – King Oscar II of Sweden appoints Prince Gustaf to serve as his regent.
 August 8 – Fourteen employees of a department store in Albany, New York are killed when the building collapses suddenly.
 August 9 – The peace conference to end the Russo-Japanese War between Russia and Japan begins at Portsmouth, New Hampshire.
 August 11 – The Russian Council appointed by Tsar Nicholas II meets at Peterhoff and approves a plan for a national Duma, the first representative assembly in the Empire.
 August 12 – The first running takes place of the Shelsley Walsh Speed Hill Climb in England, the world's oldest motorsport event to be staged continuously on its original course.
 August 13 – At a referendum in Norway, voters opt almost unanimously for dissolution of the union with Sweden.
 August 15 – Mexican-American prospector Pablo Valencia gets lost in the Sonoran Desert of Arizona with no water. Enduring almost eight days of dehydration, Valencia wanders until he is discovered on August 23 by anthropologist William J. McGee and McGee's Papago Indian assistant, Jose.
 August 20 – Chinese revolutionary leader Sun Yat-sen forms the first chapter of T'ung Meng Hui, a union of all secret societies determined to bringing down the Manchu dynasty.
 August 21 – The Sequoyah Constitutional Convention takes place in Muskogee in the U.S. Indian Territory and approves a constitution for the proposed State of Sequoyah, seeking admission as the only Native American majority state in the U.S. President Roosevelt will reject the idea in favor of joining the Indian Territory with the white-ruled Oklahoma Territory to create the 46th U.S. state.
 August 22 – The sinking of the Japanese ferry Kinjo Maru kills 160 people after the British ship HMS Baralong collides with it in the Sea of Japan.
 August 23 – A. Roy Knabenshue introduces the dirigible to the skies of New York City, piloting the lighter-than-air vehicle within view of hundreds of thousands of spectators.
 August 24 – Frederick D. White becomes the first Commissioner of the Northwest Territories in Canada, and will serve until his death in 1918.
 August 25 – Theodore Roosevelt became the first U.S. President to travel underwater, after boarding the Navy submarine USS Plunger.
 August 26 – Near Point Barrow, Alaska, the crew of the Norwegian ship Gjoa, led by Roald Amundsen, make the breakthrough of finding the long-sought "Northwest Passage" from the Atlantic Ocean to the Pacific Ocean.  
 August 27 – Tsar Nicholas II issues a decree restoring to Russia's universities the autonomy that had been taken away from them in 1884. 
 August 30 – A solar eclipse takes place, with greatest visibility in North Africa.

September 

 September 1 – The Canadian provinces of Alberta and Saskatchewan are established from the southwestern part of the Northwest Territories.
 September 2 – The millennia-old imperial examination system for the civil service is abolished in Qing dynasty China.
 September 5 – Russo-Japanese War: Treaty of Portsmouth – In New Hampshire, a treaty mediated by U.S. President Theodore Roosevelt is signed by Japan and Russia. Russia cedes the island of Sakhalin together with port and rail rights in Manchuria to Japan.
 September 8 – The 7.2  Calabria earthquake shakes Southern Italy with a maximum Mercalli intensity of XI (Extreme), killing between 557 and 2,500 people.
 September 10 – Crystal Palace F.C. is founded in London.
 September 27
 Albert Einstein submits for publication his paper "Does the Inertia of a Body Depend Upon Its Energy Content?", in which he puts forward the idea of mass–energy equivalence by publishing the famous equation E = mc2 (published November 21).
 Ta-Ching Government Bank, predecessor of Bank of China, is founded in Peiping.

October 

 October 1
 A Czech worker, František Pavlík (b. 1885), is bayoneted to death during a demonstration for a Czech university in Brno. This event is the motivation for a piano sonata, 1. X. 1905, by composer Leoš Janáček, which premières on 27 January 1906.
 Turkish Association football team Galatasaray is founded in Istanbul.
 October 2 –  is laid down in the United Kingdom, revolutionizing battleship design and triggering a naval arms race.
 October 5 – The Wright brothers' third aeroplane (Wright Flyer III) stays in the air for 39 minutes with Wilbur piloting, the first aeroplane flight lasting over half an hour.
 October 11 – The Institute of Musical Art, predecessor of the Juilliard School, opens in New York City.
 October 13 – Annie Kenney and Christabel Pankhurst interrupt a Liberal Party (UK) rally at the Free Trade Hall in Manchester, England, and choose imprisonment when convicted, the first militant action of the suffragette campaign.
 October 14 – The National League's New York Giants win baseball's World Series, beating the American League's Philadelphia Athletics, 2-0, in Game 5.
 October 16 – The Partition of Bengal is made by Lord Curzon to separate the region of Bengal into Muslim and Hindu territories until its reunification in 1911.
 October 26 – Sweden–Norway agrees to the repeal of the union with Norway, forming the two modern-day countries.
 October 29 (October 16 O.S.) – In the Russian Empire:
 Russian Revolution of 1905: The Imperial Russian Army opens fire on a meeting at a street market in Tallinn, Governorate of Estonia, killing 94 and injuring over 200 people.
 The Circum-Baikal Railway is brought into permanent operation, completing through rail communication on the Trans-Siberian Railway.
 October 30 (October 17 Old Style) – October Manifesto: Tsar Nicholas II of Russia is forced to announce the granting of his country's first constitution (the Russian Constitution of 1906), conceding a national assembly (State Duma) with limited powers.
 October – Fauvist artists, led by Henri Matisse and André Derain, first exhibit their works, at the Salon d'Automne in Paris.

November 

 November 1 – Lahti, the city of Finland, is granted city rights by Tsar Nicholas II of Russia, the last Grand Duke of Finland.
 November 4 – The application of the infamous February Manifesto, removing the veto of the Diet of the autonomous Grand Principality of Finland over matters considered by the Emperor to concern Russian imperial interests, is interrupted by the new November Manifesto. The Senate of Finland is ordered to put forward a proposal for parliamentary reform, based on unicameralism and universal and equal suffrage.
 November 7 – Lawyer and liberal politician Karl Staaff becomes Prime Minister of Sweden, after a Riksdag election based mainly on voting rights reform.
 November 9 – The Province of Alberta, Canada, holds its first general election.
 November 12 – Norway holds a referendum, resulting in popular approval of the Storting's decision to authorise the government to make the offer of the throne of the newly independent country.
 November 17 – The Japan–Korea Treaty of 1905 ("Eulsa Treaty") effectively makes Korea a protectorate of Japan.
 November 18 – Prince Carl of Denmark becomes King Haakon VII of Norway.
 November 28 – Irish nationalist Arthur Griffith founds Sinn Féin in Dublin, as a political party whose goal is independence for all of Ireland.
 November–December – Russian Revolution of 1905: In the Baltic governorates, workers and peasants burn and loot hundreds of Baltic German manors. The Imperial Russian Army thereafter executes and deports thousands of looters.

December 

 December 2 – Norsk Hydro, predecessor of Equinor, a state-run energy product and grid brand in Scandinavia, is founded in Norway.
 December 7–18 – Moscow Uprising: A Bolshevik-led revolt is suppressed by the army.
 December 9 – The 1905 French law on the Separation of the Churches and the State is passed, enacting laïcité.
 December 11 – In support of the Moscow Uprising, the Council of Workers' Deputies of Kiev stages a mass uprising, establishing the Shuliavka Republic in the city, December 12–16.
 December 15 – The Pushkin House is established in Saint Petersburg, Russia, to preserve the cultural heritage of Alexander Pushkin.
December 16 – In the sport of rugby union, the "Match of the Century" is played between Wales and New Zealand at Cardiff Arms Park.
 December 30
 A bomb kills Frank Steunenberg, ex-governor of Idaho; the case leads to a trial against leaders of the Western Federation of Miners.
 Franz Lehár's operetta The Merry Widow is first performed, at the Theater an der Wien, Vienna.

Date unknown 
 Pathé Frères colors black and white films by machine.
 Huckleberry Finn and Tom Sawyer are banned from the Brooklyn Public Library, for setting a "bad example."
 Alfred Einhorn introduces novocaine.
 Wolves become extinct in Japan.

Births

January – March 

 January 1 – Malek Bennabi, Algerian philosopher (d. 1973)
 January 2
 Michael Tippett, English composer (d. 1998)
 Anna May Wong, American actress (d. 1961)
 January 3 – Nobuhito, Prince Takamatsu, younger brother of Japanese Emperor Hirohito (d. 1987)
 January 4 – Sterling Holloway, American actor (d. 1992)
 January 12 – Tex Ritter, American actor and singer (d. 1974)
 January 13 – Kay Francis, American actress (d. 1968)
 January 14 – Takeo Fukuda, 67th Prime Minister of Japan (1976-1978) (d. 1995)
 January 15 – Torin Thatcher, English actor, Lieutenant colonel of the Royal Artillery (d. 1981)
 January 17
 D. R. Kaprekar, Indian recreational mathematician (d. 1986)
 Saeb Salam, 4-time prime minister of Lebanon (d. 2000)
 Guillermo Stábile, Argentine football player, manager (d. 1966)
 January 18 – Joseph Bonanno (Joe Bananas), American gangster (d. 2002)
 January 21 – Christian Dior, French couturier (d. 1957)
 January 24 – J. Howard Marshall, American billionaire (d. 1995)
 January 26
 Maria von Trapp, Austrian singer and leader of the Trapp Family Singers, whose life is dramatized in The Sound of Music (d. 1987)
 Charles Lane, American actor (d. 2007)
 January 29 – Barnett Newman, American painter (d. 1970)
 January 31 – John O'Hara, American writer (d. 1970)
 February 1 – Emilio Segrè, Italian physicist, Nobel Prize laureate (d. 1989)
 February 2 – Ayn Rand, American author, philosopher (The Fountainhead) (d. 1982)
 February 7
 Paul Nizan, French author (d. 1940)
 Ulf von Euler, Swedish physiologist, academic and Nobel Prize laureate (d. 1983)
 February 10 
 Walter A. Brown, American basketball, ice hockey pioneer (d. 1964)
 Chick Webb, American drummer and bandleader (d. 1939)
 February 13 – Ra'ana Liaquat Ali Khan, Pakistani stateswoman, First Lady of Pakistan (d. 1990)
 February 15 – Harold Arlen, American popular music composer (d. 1986)
 February 17 – Frans Piët, Dutch comics artist (Sjors en Sjimmie) (d. 1997)
 February 23 – Derrick Henry Lehmer, American mathematician (d. 1991)
 February 27 – Franchot Tone, American actor (d. 1968)
 March 3 – Marie Glory, French silent-screen actress (d. 2009)
 March 10 – Richard Haydn, English comic actor (d. 1985)
 March 12 – Takashi Shimura, Japanese actor (d. 1982)
 March 15 – Berthold Schenk Graf von Stauffenberg, German lawyer, Nazi opponent (d. 1944)
 March 16 – Elisabeth Flickenschildt, German actress (d. 1977)
 March 18
 Thomas Townsend Brown, American inventor (d. 1985)
 Robert Donat, English actor (d. 1958)
 March 19 – Albert Speer, German Nazi official, architect (d. 1981)
 March 20 – Vera Panova, Soviet-Russian writer (d. 1973)
 March 23
 Lale Andersen, German singer (d. 1972)
 John Randall, English physicist, biophysicist (d. 1984) 
 March 25 – Pote Sarasin, Thai diplomat and politician, 9th Prime Minister of Thailand (d. 2000)
 March 30
 Mikio Oda, Japanese athlete (d. 1998)
 Albert Pierrepoint, British executioner (d. 1992)

April – June 

 April 1
 Gaston Eyskens, Prime Minister of Belgium (d. 1988)
 Paul Hasluck, Australian statesman, 17th Governor-General of Australia (d. 1993)
 April 18 – George H. Hitchings, American physician, pharmacologist and Nobel Prize laureate (d. 1998)
 April 21 – Pat Brown, American lawyer, politician and 32nd Governor of California (d. 1996)
 April 25 – George Nēpia, New Zealand Maori rugby player (d. 1986)
 April 26 – Raúl Leoni, President of Venezuela (d. 1972)
 April 29 – George Beamish, British Royal Air Force air marshal, Irish rugby player (d. 1967)
 April 30 – Sergey Nikolsky, Russian mathematician (d. 2012)
 May 3 – Werner Fenchel, German mathematician (d. 1988)
 May 5 – Floyd Gottfredson, American cartoonist, primarily known for the Mickey Mouse comic strip (d. 1986)
May 9 – Lilí Álvarez, Spanish tennis player, author and feminist (d. 1998)
 May 11 
Lise de Baissac, Mauritian-born SOE agent, war hero (d. 2004)
Catherine Bauer Wurster, American architect and public housing advocate (d. 1964)
 May 13 – Fakhruddin Ali Ahmed, Indian lawyer, politician and 5th President of India (d. 1977)
 May 15 – Joseph Cotten, American actor (d. 1994)
 May 16 – Henry Fonda, American actor (d. 1982)
 May 17 – Roy Nelson, American cartoonist (d. 1956)
 May 20 – Gerrit Achterberg, Dutch poet (d. 1962)
 May 22 – Tom Driberg, British politician/journalist (d. 1976)
 May 24 – Mikhail Sholokhov, Russian novelist, short story writer and Nobel Prize laureate (d. 1984)
 May 27 
 Signe Johansson-Engdahl, Swedish Olympic diver (d. 2010)
 Lilo Milchsack (b. Lisalotte Duden), German promoter of Anglo-German relations (d. 1992)
 May 28 – Sada Abe, Japanese actress (d. 1970)
 May 29 – Sebastian Shaw, English actor (d. 1994)
 June 1 – Robert Newton, English actor (d. 1956)
 June 3 
 Tupua Tamasese Meaʻole, Samoan politician (d. 1963)
 Martin Gottfried Weiss, Nazi commandant (d. 1946)
 June 5 – John Abbott, English actor (d. 1996)
 June 7 – James J. Braddock, Irish-American heavyweight boxer (d. 1974)
 June 11 – Paul Wormser, French fencer (d. 1944)
 June 12 – Ray Barbuti, American athlete (d. 1975)
 June 13 – Franco Riccardi, Italian fencer (d. 1968)
 June 14 
Liesel Bach, German aerobatic pilot (d. 1992)
Arthur Davis, American animator (d. 2000)
 June 19 – Mildred Natwick, American stage, film actress (d. 1994)
 June 21
 Jean-Paul Sartre, French existentialist (d. 1980)
 Zeng Xueming, Chinese midwife, wife of Hồ Chí Minh (d. 1991)
 Tino Bianchi, Italian actor (d. 1996)
 June 23
 Jack Pickersgill, Canadian civil servant and politician (d. 1997)
 Isaac Schapera, English anthropologist (d. 2003)
 Mary Livingstone, American radio comedian (d. 1983)
 June 24 – Fred Alderman, American sprint runner (d. 1998)
 June 25 
 Leon deValinger Jr., American archivist, historian (d. 2000)
 Arthur Maria Rabenalt, Austrian film director (d. 1993)
 Jun'ichi Yoda, Japanese poet (d. 1997)
 June 26 – Jack Longland, British educator, mountain climber and broadcaster (d. 1993)
 June 27 
 Lady Rachel Pepys, Lady-in-Waiting to Princess Marina, Duchess of Kent (d. 1992)
 Kwan Tak-hing, Hong Kong actor (d. 1996)
 Tarzan Woltzen, American professional basketball player (d. 1995)
 June 28 – Ashley Montagu, British-American anthropologist (d. 1999)
 June 29 – Oswald Denison, New Zealand rower (d. 1990)
 June 30
 John Harmon, American actor (d. 1985)
 Nestor Paiva, American actor (d. 1966)
 John Van Ryn, American tennis champion (d. 1999)

July – September 

 July 2 – Eugene E. Lindsey, United States Navy officer (d. 1942)
 July 3 
 Johnny Gibson, American runner, Olympic athlete (d. 2006)
 Clorinda Málaga de Prado, First Lady of Peru (d. 1993)
 July 4 
 Robert Hankey, 2nd Baron Hankey, British diplomat, public servant (d. 1996)
 Irving Johnson, American sail training pioneer (d. 1991)
 Marie-Thérèse Paquin, Canadian pianist (d. 1997)
 Lionel Trilling, American literary critic, short story writer, essayist and teacher (d. 1975)
 July 5 – Jock Cameron, South African cricketer (d. 1935)
 July 6 – Leonid Pavlovich Potapov, Russian ethnographer (d. 2000)
 July 8 
 Kathleen Hamilton, Duchess of Abercorn (d. 1990)
 Leonid Amalrik, Russian animator (d. 1997)
 July 10 – Thomas Gomez, American actor (d. 1971)
 July 11 
Betty Allan, Australian statistician and biometrician (d. 1952)
Kikutaro Baba, Japanese malacologist (d. 2000)
David Louis Lidman, American actor (d. 1982)
 July 12
 Edward Bernds, American director (d. 2000)
 Prince John of the United Kingdom (d. 1919)
 July 13
 Magda Foy, American child actress (d. 2000)
 Eugenio Pagnini, Italian modern pentathlete (d. 1993)
 Edvin Laine, Finnish film director (d. 1989)
 Alfredo M. Santos, Filipino general (d. 1990)
 July 14 – Laurence Chisholm Young, American mathematician (d. 2000)
 July 15
 Anita Farra, Italian actress (d. 2008)
 Dorothy Fields, American songwriter (d. 1988)
 Addie McPhail, American actress (d. 2003)
 Shirley Povich, American sports columnist (d. 1998)
 July 16 – Lou Garland, American baseball player (d. 1990)
 July 17
 William Gargan, American actor (d. 1979)
 Guillermo Hyslop, American businessman (d. 1993)
 Araken Patusca, Brazilian footballer (d. 1990)
 Marjorie Reeves, British historian, educationalist (d. 2003)
 July 19
 Geertje Kuijntjes, Dutch supercentenarian (d. 2019)
 Giuseppe Girotti, Italian Roman Catholic priest and blessed (d. 1945)
 July 20 – Joseph Levis, American fencer (d. 2005)
 July 21
 David M. Kennedy, American politician, businessman (d. 1996)
 Diana Trilling, American literary critic, author (d. 1996)
 July 22 – Doc Cramer, American baseball player (d. 1990)
 July 23 – Leopold Engleitner, Austrian Holocaust survivor (d. 2013)
 July 25
 Elias Canetti, Bulgarian-born British writer (d. 1994)
 Masazō Nonaka, Japanese supercentenarian (d. 2019)
 Denys Watkins-Pitchford, British writer of children's books (d. 1990)
 July 26 – Alex Radcliffe, American baseball player (d. 1983)
 July 29
 Clara Bow, American film actress (d. 1965)
 Dag Hammarskjöld, Swedish diplomat, 2nd Secretary-General of the United Nations (d. 1961)
 July 30 – Pedro Quartucci, Argentine boxer, actor (d. 1983)
 July 31 – Robert A. Grant, American judge (d. 1998)
 August 2
 Ernst Kals, German submarine commander (d. 1979)
 Franz König, Austrian Roman Catholic archbishop (d. 2004)
 Myrna Loy, American actress (d. 1993)
 Ruth Nelson, American actress (d. 1992)
 August 4 – Abeid Karume, 1st President of Zanzibar (assassinated) (d. 1972)
 August 8 – André Jolivet, French composer (d. 1974)
 August 9 – Leo Genn, English actor (d. 1978)
 August 11 – Erwin Chargaff, Austrian biochemist (d. 2002)
 August 13 – Gareth Jones, Welsh journalist (d. 1935)
August 16 – Marian Rejewski, Polish mathematician, cryptologist (d. 1980)
 August 20 
 Jean Gebser, German-born author, linguist and poet (d. 1973)
 Mikio Naruse, Japanese filmmaker (d. 1969)
 August 22 – John Lyng, Norwegian politician, prime minister (d. 1978)
 August 23 – Constant Lambert, British composer (d. 1951)
 August 24 – Siaka Stevens, President of Sierra Leone (d. 1988)
 August 25 – Faustina Kowalska, Polish "Secretary of Divine Mercy", saint (d. 1938)
 August 28 – Sam Levene, American actor (d. 1980)
 August 29
 Dhyan Chand, Indian hockey player (d. 1979)
 Al Taliaferro, Disney comics artist (d. 1969)
 August 31 – Dore Schary, American film writer, director and producer (d. 1980)
 September 1 
 Chau Sen Cocsal Chhum, Cambodian politician (d. 2009)
 Father Chrysanthus, Dutch arachnologist (d. 1972)
 Elvera Sanchez, Puerto Rican dancer (d. 2000)
 September 3 – Carl David Anderson, American physicist, Nobel Prize laureate (d. 1991)
 September 5
 Arthur Koestler, Hungarian-born novelist and social philosopher (d. 1983)
 Justiniano Montano, Filipino politician (d. 2005)
 September 6 – Walther Müller, German physicist (d. 1979)
 September 10 – Ibrahim Biçakçiu, Albanian politician, 2-time Prime Minister of Albania (d. 1977)
 September 12 
Linda Agostini, English-Australian murder victim (d. 1934)
Ali Amini, Iranian politician, 67th Prime Minister of Iran (d. 1992)
 September 18
 Eddie Anderson, African-American actor (d. 1977)
 Agnes de Mille, American choreographer (d. 1993)
 Greta Garbo, Swedish actress (d. 1990)
September 19 – Judith Auer, German World War II resistance fighter (d. 1944)
 September 20 – Reinhold O. Carlson, American politician (d. 2006)
 September 22
 Haakon Lie, Norwegian politician (d. 2009)
 Eugen Sänger, Austrian aerospace engineer (d. 1964)
 September 24 – Severo Ochoa, Spanish–American biochemist, Nobel Prize laureate (d. 1993)
 September 26 
 Juliana Koo, Chinese-American diplomat and supercentenarian (d. 2017)
 Emilio Navarro, Puerto Rican baseball player (d. 2011)
 September 28 – Max Schmeling, German boxer (d. 2005)
 September 30
 Savitri Devi, Greek writer, National Socialist philosopher (d. 1982)
 Nevill Francis Mott, English physicist, Nobel Prize laureate (d. 1996)
 Michael Powell, English film director (d. 1990)

October – December 

 October 6 – Helen Wills, American tennis player (d. 1998)
 October 7 – Andy Devine, American character actor (d. 1977)
 October 11 – Fred Trump, American real estate developer, father of Donald J. Trump, 45th President of the United States (d. 1999)
 October 13 – John Rinehart Blue, American military officer, educator, businessperson and politician (d. 1965)
 October 15 – C. P. Snow, English novelist (d. 1980)
 October 18 – Félix Houphouët-Boigny, President of Ivory Coast (d. 1993)
 October 23
 Felix Bloch, Swiss-born physicist, Nobel Prize laureate (d. 1983)
 Claude de Cambronne, French aircraft manufacturer (d. 1993)
 Yen Chia-kan, 2nd President of the Republic of China (d. 1993)
 October 29
 Giuseppe Alessi, Italian politician (d. 2009)
 Reg Bunn, English comic book artist (d. 1971)
 Berthold Wolpe, German-born British calligrapher, typographer and illustrator (d. 1989)
 October 31 – Harry Frederick Harlow, American psychologist (d. 1981)
 November 2
 Isobel Andrews, New Zealand writer (d. 1990)
 Georges Schehadé, Lebanese poet, playwright (d. 1989)
 November 3 – Lois Mailou Jones, African-American artist (d. 1998)
 November 4 – Dragutin Tadijanović, Croatian poet (d. 2007)
 November 5 – Sajjad Zaheer, Indian-born Urdu writer, revolutionary (d. 1973)
 November 7 – William Alwyn, English composer (d. 1985)
 November 9 – Erika Mann, German author, war correspondent (d. 1969)
 November 15 – Mantovani, Italian-born conductor, arranger (d. 1980)
 November 17
 Queen Astrid of Belgium (d. 1935)
 Mischa Auer, Russian-American actor (d. 1967)
 November 19 – Tommy Dorsey, American bandleader (d. 1956)
November 21 – Georgina Battiscombe, British biographer (d. 2006)
November 25 – Samiha Ayverdi, Turkish author and Sufi mystic (d. 1993)
 December 5 
 Frank Pakenham, 7th Earl of Longford, British peer, politician and reformer (d. 2001)
 Otto Preminger, Austrian-born American film director (d. 1986)
 December 7 
 Gerard Kuiper, Dutch astronomer (d. 1973) 
 Edelgard Huber von Gersdorff, German supercentenarian (d. 2018)
 December 8 – Frank Faylen, American actor (d. 1985)
 December 11 – Gilbert Roland, Mexican-born American actor (d. 1994)
 December 16 – Ruben Nirvi, Finnish linguist and professor (d. 1986)
 December 17 – Simo Häyhä, Finnish sniper (d. 2002)
 December 19 – Irving Kahn, American financial analyst, investor (d. 2015)
 December 21 – Anthony Powell, British author (d. 2000)
 December 22 – Kenneth Rexroth, American poet (d. 1982)
 December 24 – Howard Hughes, American millionaire, aviation pioneer and film mogul (d. 1976)
 December 27 – Cliff Arquette (Charley Weaver), American comic (d. 1974)
 December 31 – Jule Styne, English-born composer (d. 1994)

Date unknown
 Gershon Liebman, French rabbi (d. 1997)

Deaths

January–February 

 January 1 
 Johannes Ludovicus Paquay, Belgian Roman Catholic priest and blessed (b. 1828)
 January 2 – Clara Augusta Jones Trask, American dime novelist (b. 1839)
 January 6
 José María Gabriel y Galán, Spanish poet (b. 1870)
 Ann Eliza Smith, American patriot (b. 1819)
 January 9 – Louise Michel, French anarchist (b. 1830)
 January 11 – Yehudah Aryeh Leib Alter, Polish Hasidic rabbi (b. 1847)
 January 14 – Ernst Abbe, German physicist (b. 1840)
 January 19 – Debendranath Tagore, Indian philosopher (b. 1817)
 January 20 – Gyula Szapáry, 10th Prime Minister of Hungary (b. 1832)
 January 22
 Ștefan Fălcoianu, Romanian general and politician (b. 1835)
 Clara Harrison Stranahan, American college co-founder and trustee (b. 1831)
 January 27 – Watson Heston, American cartoonist (b. 1846)
 January 31 – Konstantin Savitsky, Russian painter (b. 1844)
 February 2 –Mabel Cahill, Irish tennis champion (b. 1863)
 February 3 – Adolf Bastian, German anthropologist (b. 1826)
 February 4 – Louis-Ernest Barrias, French sculptor (b. 1841)
 February 5 – Andrijica Šimić, Croatian hajduk (b. 1833)
 February 9 – Adolph von Menzel, German painter (b. 1815)
 February 12 – Marcel Schwob, French writer (b. 1867)
 February 15 – Lew Wallace, American writer (Ben-Hur: A Tale of the Christ) (b. 1827)
 February 16 – Jay Cooke, American financier (b. 1821)
 February 17 – Grand Duke Sergei Alexandrovich of Russia (b. 1857)
 February 19 – Benjamin Harris Babbidge, Australian politician, 19th Mayor of Brisbane (b. 1836)
 February 20 – Jeremiah W. Farnham, American merchant captain (b. c. 1828)
 February 24 – Fanny Cochrane Smith, Aboriginal Tasmanian (b. 1834)
 February 25 – Edward Cooper, 83rd Mayor of New York City (b. 1824)

March–April 

 March 1 – Jean-Baptiste Claude Eugène Guillaume, French sculptor (b. 1822)
 March 3 – Antonio Annetto Caruana, Maltese archaeologist, author (b. 1830)
 March 6 
 Pierre Théoma Boisrond-Canal, 12th President of Haiti (b. 1832)
 John Henninger Reagan, American Confederate politician (b. 1818)
 March 13 – Nil Izvorov, Bulgarian Orthodox priest and venerable (b. 1823)
 March 15
 Meyer Guggenheim, Swiss-born patriarch of the Guggenheim Family (b. 1828)
 Amalie Skram, Norwegian author, feminist (b. 1846)
 March 17 – Juan Nepomuceno Zegrí Moreno, Spanish Roman Catholic priest and blessed (b. 1831)
 March 23 – Martha E. Cram Bates, American journalist (b. 1839)
 March 24 – Jules Verne, French science fiction author (Twenty Thousand Leagues Under the Sea) (b. 1828)
 March 25 – Maurice Barrymore, British actor (b. 1849)
 March 28 – Huang Zunxian, Chinese poet, writer (b. 1848)
 April 4 – Constantin Meunier, Belgian painter and sculptor (b. 1831)
 April 7 – Maria Assunta Pallotta, Italian Roman Catholic religious professed and blessed (b. 1878)
 April 9 – Frederic Thesiger, 2nd Baron Chelmsford, British general (b. 1827)
 April 18 – Juan Valera y Alcalá-Galiano, Spanish writer (b. 1824)
 April 23 – Joseph Jefferson, American actor (b. 1829)

May–June

 May 11 
 Andrzej Jerzy Mniszech, Polish painter (b. 1823)
 Ceferino Namuncurá, Argentine Roman Catholic lay brother and blessed (b. 1886)
 May 13 – Sam S. Shubert, American theater owner (b. 1878)
 May 14 – Jessie Bartlett Davis, American actress and singer (b. 1860)
 May 23 – Mary Livermore, American advocate of women's rights (b. 1820)
 May 26 – Alphonse James de Rothschild, French banker, philanthropist (b. 1827)
 May 29 – Francisco Silvela, Spanish politician, Prime Minister (b. 1843)
 June 1 
 Émile Delahaye, French automotive pioneer (b. 1843)
 Giovanni Battista Scalabrini, Italian Roman Catholic prelate and blessed (b. 1839)
 June 3 – James Hudson Taylor, British missionary (b. 1832)
 June 4 – Jan Mikulicz-Radecki, Polish-Austrian surgeon (b. 1850)
 June 5 – Małgorzata Szewczyk, Polish Roman Catholic religious professed and blessed (b. 1828)
 June 7 – Carl Kellner, Austrian mystic (b. 1851)
 June 13 – Theodoros Diligiannis, 5-time Prime Minister of Greece (assassinated) (b. 1820)
 June 17 – Máximo Gómez, Cuban general (b. 1836)
 June 18 
 Carmine Crocco, Italian brigand (b. 1830)
 Per Teodor Cleve, Swedish chemist and geologist (b. 1840)
 June 22 – Francis Lubbock, Governor of Texas (b. 1815)
 June 27 – Grigory Vakulinchuk, Russian mutineer (b. 1877)

July–August 
 July 1 – John Hay, American diplomat, private secretary to Abraham Lincoln (b. 1838)
 July 4 – Élisée Reclus, French geographer and anarchist (b. 1830)
 July 8 – Walter Kittredge, American musician and composer (b. 1834)
 July 11 – Muhammad Abduh, Egyptian philosopher, jurist (b. 1849)
 July 15 – Raimundo Fernández-Villaverde, 28th Prime Minister of Spain (b. 1848)
 July 30 – Gioacchino La Lomia, Italian Roman Catholic priest and venerable (b. 1831)
 August 1 – John Brown, Canadian politician (b. 1841)
 August 4
 Walther Flemming, German biologist (b. 1843)
 Kinjikitile Ngwale, Tanzanian rebel leader
 August 14 – Simeon Solomon, British artist (b. 1840)
 August 21 – Mary Mapes Dodge, American author of children's literature (b. 1831)
 August 31 – Francesco Tamagno, Italian opera singer (b. 1850)

September–October

 September 5 – Touch the Clouds, Minneconjou chief (b. c. 1838)
 September 13 – René Goblet, French politician, 52nd Prime Minister of France (b. 1828)
 September 14 – Pierre Savorgnan de Brazza, Franco-Italian explorer (b. 1852)
 September 18 – George MacDonald, Scottish author, poet and Christian minister (b. 1824)
 September 19 – Thomas John Barnardo, Irish philanthropist (b. 1845)
 October 3 – José-Maria de Heredia, French poet (b. 1842)
 October 6 – Ferdinand von Richthofen, German explorer and geographer (b. 1833)
 October 11 – Isabelle Gatti de Gamond, Belgian educationalist and feminist (b. 1839)
 October 13 – Sir Henry Irving, English actor (b. 1838)
 October 15 – Mikhail Dragomirov, Russian general (b. 1830)
 October 29 – Étienne Desmarteau, Canadian athlete (b. 1873)

November–December
 November 2 – Albert von Kölliker, Swiss anatomist (b. 1817)
 November 9 – William Parrott, British coalminer (b. 1843)
November 14 – Robert Whitehead, British engineer and inventor (b. 1823)
 November 17
 Adolphe, Grand Duke of Luxembourg (b. 1817)
 Prince Philippe, Count of Flanders (b. 1837)
 November 22 – Viktor Sakharov, Russian general (assassinated) (b. 1848)
 December 5 – Henry Eckford, British horticulturist (b. 1823)
 December 9
 Henry Holmes, British composer, violinist (b. 1839)
 Sir Richard Claverhouse Jebb, British scholar, politician (b. 1841)

Date unknown 
 Abdul Wahid Bengali, Muslim theologian and teacher (b. 1850)
 Mary Thomas, West Indian labor leader (b. 1848)

Nobel Prizes 

 Physics – Philipp Eduard Anton von Lenard
 Chemistry – Johann Friedrich Wilhelm Adolf von Baeyer
 Medicine – Robert Koch
 Literature – Henryk Sienkiewicz
 Peace – Bertha von Suttner

References

Further reading
 Gilbert, Martin (1997). A History of the Twentieth Century: Volume 1 1900–1933. pp 105–22.